Fazlagić Tower is a ruined tower located near Gacko in eastern Bosnia and Herzegovina.

It was built in the 17th century by Ahmed Fazlagić.

Notes
Fazlagića Kula has been a  mosque in time but is not currently.
Fazlagića Kula is also known as the last occupied territory of NDH (Nezavisna Država Hrvatska, Independent State of Croatia).
The whole area, in which there are nine villages, is called Fazlagića Kula.

See also
List of castles in Bosnia and Herzegovina

External links
Kula Fazlagic

Castles in Bosnia and Herzegovina